Mallinckrodt or von Mallinckrodt is a surname. Notable people include:

Bernhard von Mallinckrodt (1591–1664), dean of Münster cathedral
George von Mallinckrodt (1930–2021), German merchant banker
Hermann von Mallinckrodt (1821–1874), German parliamentarian
Pauline Mallinckrodt (1817–1881), German Roman Catholic